David Michael Jenkins (born August 29, 1947) is an American singer-songwriter and guitarist, best known as the lead singer and guitarist for the California smooth rock band Pablo Cruise. Jenkins was a member of the band at its conception in 1973, and stayed until they disbanded in 1986. In 1996, Jenkins, Bud Cockrell and two new members reformed Pablo Cruise. He was also a member of the country rock band Southern Pacific between 1987 and 1989.

Throughout the late 80's, as the  original lead vocalist, Jenkins continued touring in the world of country music, with Southern Pacific. 
As, they racked up hits like “Midnight Highway” and “New Shade of Blue” and “Honey I Dare You.”
The band toured all over the United States. 
In 1994, Dave teamed up with the well known native Hawaiian singer, Kapono Beamer. They released the album “Cruisin’ on Hawaiian Time”
Together they were nominated for the prestigious Hoku Award for Album of the year. 
Dave has recorded with other greats including, Jefferson Starship, Huey Lewis and the News,  The Doobie Brothers, to name just a few. 
Currently, as of 2019, he is joined by Cory Lerios, co founder of Pablo Cruise, Steve Price, original member and Larry Antonio and Robbie Wyckoff, as they tour to perform their two greatest hits. 
Dave's favorite thing to enjoy is being in Hawaii with a surf board and in his flip flops.

References

External links

 Pablo Cruise Bio (archived from the original on 28 October 2006)
 Bio

1947 births
Living people
Pablo Cruise members
Southern Pacific (band) members
Lead guitarists
American male guitarists
American male pop singers
American male singer-songwriters
American pop guitarists
American rock guitarists
American rock songwriters
American rock singers
Guitarists from San Francisco
20th-century American guitarists
20th-century American male musicians
Place of birth missing (living people)
Singer-songwriters from California